Sampathwaduge Amal Rohitha Silva (born 12 December 1960) is a former Sri Lankan cricketer who played in nine Test matches and 20 One Day Internationals from 1983 to 1988. He was a left-handed wicketkeeper batsman and opened the batting for Sri Lanka.

School times
Silva is a past student of Prince of Wales' College, Moratuwa and St Peter's College, Colombo.

International career
From when he made his Test debut against New Zealand, Silva was in a battle with Guy de Alwis for first choice gloveman. Due to an injury to de Alwis in 1984, Silva toured England with Sri Lanka aiming to cement his spot in the side. In the 1st Test and Lord's he opened the batting and made an unbeaten 102 in the second innings. He was rewarded by being included in their next Test series, against India. After taking 9 catches in the 1st Test he took another 8 in the 2nd, as well as making a career best 111. He finished the series with 22 dismissals, a Sri Lankan record.

References

External links 
 

1960 births
Living people
Sri Lanka Test cricketers
Sri Lanka One Day International cricketers
Sri Lankan cricketers
Nondescripts Cricket Club cricketers
Moratuwa Sports Club cricketers
Sportspeople from Moratuwa
Alumni of St. Peter's College, Colombo
Alumni of Prince of Wales' College, Moratuwa
Wicket-keepers